Mounir Fakhry Abdel Nour (born 21 August 1945) is an Egyptian businessman and politician.

Early life and education
Abdel Nour was born into a Coptic Christian family on 21 August 1945. His father, Amin Fakhry Abdel Nour (1912 – 2012), was a Wafdist politician.

He graduated from a French high school in Cairo. He received a bachelor's degree from Cairo University's Faculty of Economics and Political Science. He holds a master's degree from the American University in Cairo (AUC) with a thesis entitled "private foreign investment as a source of economic development."

Career
Abdel Nour is a businessman. He began his career as representative in Egypt and the Middle East for the French bank "Banque de l'Union Européenne"  then joined American Express International Banking Corporation as vice president in Egypt. He later founded Egyptian Finance Company. In 1983 he founded the Egyptian French Company for Agro-Industries (Vitrac Company )i He was board member of the Cairo and Alexandria stock exchange, the Federation of Egyptian Industries., the center for economic studies of developing countries at Cairo university.

Abdel Nour then joined politics. He run for office in the 1995 elections, but lost. He won a seat in the 2000 general elections. and was elected Head of the opposition in Parliament. Later he was elected secretary-general of the Wafd Party. After 25 January revolution he was appointed minister of tourism in the cabinet led by then prime minister Ahmed Shafiq in February 2011. Abdel Nour succeeded Zoheir Garranah in the post. He remained in his post in the cabinets headed by Essam Sharaf followed by Kamal Ganzouri until 2 August 2012.

He refused to participate in the government of the Moslem Brothers headed by Hisham Kandil and joined the opposition. He participated in the founding of the "National Salvation Front" on 23 November 2012 and was later chosen as its Secretary General. In this capacity he was among the organizers of the 30 June 2013 uprising that ended the rule of the Moslem Brothers.

In February 2013 he joined the Cabinet headed by Ibrahim Mahlab as Minister of Trade, Industry and Investment and will retain the portfolio of Trade and Industry until 18 September 2015. On 16 July 2013, he was appointed as the minister of Industry and Foreign Trade in the interim cabinet headed by prime minister Hazem Al Beblawi.

References

External links
 Members of the Pan-African Parliament
 

1945 births
Living people
Egyptian people of Coptic descent
Cairo University alumni
The American University in Cairo alumni
Coptic politicians
Members of the Pan-African Parliament from Egypt
Coptic businesspeople
Egyptian businesspeople
New Wafd Party politicians
Trade and Industry ministers of Egypt
Tourism ministers of Egypt
Beblawi Cabinet
Investment ministers of Egypt
Coptic Christians from Egypt